Martin Kane, Private Eye is an American crime drama radio and television series sponsored by United States Tobacco Company. It aired via radio from 1949 to 1952 and was simultaneously a television series on NBC from 1949 to 1954. It was the "earliest of successful cops-and-robbers series" on television.

Radio

Martin Kane, Private Eye began as a 1949–1952 radio series starring William Gargan in the title role as New York City private detective Martin Kane. It aired on the Mutual Broadcasting System Sundays at 4:30 pm from August 7, 1949, to June 24, 1951.

The program was developed by the Kudner Agency's Myron Kirk.

When the crime drama moved to NBC Radio on July 1, 1951, Lloyd Nolan took over the title role until mid 1952. Lee Tracy portrayed Kane for the remainder of the radio series, ending December 21, 1952.

Other members of the cast were Walter Kinsella as Tucker "Hap" McMann, Nicholas Saunders as Sergeant Ross, and Frank M. Thomas as Captain Burke. Fred Uttal was the announcer. Edward L. Kahan was the producer; Ted Hediger was the director and writer.

The radio episodes aired between 1949 and 1952 were not merely audio rebroadcasts of the television show, but original episodes produced for the radio medium. Only 29 radio broadcasts are known to exist.

The program was sponsored by Old Briar pipe tobacco and Encore and Sano cigarettes, all of which were products of U.S. Tobacco Company.

Television

Gargan, Nolan, Tracy, and Mark Stevens played the title role in Martin Kane, Private Eye on live television, airing on NBC from September 1, 1949, until June 17, 1954. The television version, also sponsored by United States Tobacco Company, integrated commercials into the detective drama by having Martin Kane enter his favorite tobacco shop, where he discussed pipe tobaccos and cigarettes with the tobacconist Happy McMann (Walter Kinsella), before leaving to continue the mystery narrative.

Frank M. Thomas portrayed Captain Burke, King Calder was cast as Lieutenant Gray, Nicholas Saunders portrayed Sergeant Ross, Walter Greaza portrayed Captain Leonard, Loring Smith portrayed Captain Evans, and Sergeant Strong was portrayed by Michael Garrett. Frank Burns, the NBC pioneer and father of actor Michael Burns, produced and directed shows written by Harry Kane and Lawrence Young. Charles Paul provided the music.

At the start and finish of the show, Kane was shown in shadow, lighting his pipe. Six episodes of this show have been released in the Best of TV Detectives DVD box set.

Edward Sutherland was the producer and director. Finis Farr and Frank Wilson wrote the scripts.

Gargan returned to the role for 39 episodes of the syndicated series The New Adventures of Martin Kane, premiering September 14, 1957, filmed in Europe for United Artists. In this version, Kane was based in London. After its original run, the series was resyndicated with the title Assignment Danger.

Comic books
  
The radio-TV series had a 1950 tie-in comic book, Martin Kane, Private Eye, published by Fox and illustrated by Wally Wood, Joe Orlando and Martin Rosenthal.

Cultural references
 
In the second episode of the "Topsy Turvy World" sequence ("Funny Business in the Books, or The Library Card") of The Bullwinkle Show (which aired on NBC), Rocky the Flying Squirrel and Bullwinkle J. Moose are being escorted out of the town library by a gun-wielding man in a black fedora. Rocky wonders aloud whether the unknown man is from another TV show, leading Bullwinkle to confront him. "Say, fella, the Martin Kane show was dropped this year, you know?"

The series was satirized in Mad 5 (June–July 1953) as "Kane Keen, Private Eye", illustrated by Jack Davis.

Mad'''s lampoon of Julius Caesar (Mad'' 17, illustrated by Wally Wood) references a detective called "Martin Walking-Kane".

References

External links
 Martin Kane, Private Eye at IMDB
 The New Adventures of Martin Kane at IMDB
 
 Thrilling Detective: Martin Kane

American radio dramas
Detective radio shows
1949 radio programme debuts
1952 radio programme endings
1940s American crime drama television series
1950s American crime drama television series
American detective television series
Mutual Broadcasting System programs
Radio programs adapted into television shows
Radio programs adapted into comics
1949 American television series debuts
1954 American television series endings
1940s American radio programs
1950s American radio programs
American live television series
Black-and-white American television shows
NBC original programming
NBC radio programs
Kane, Martin
Comics based on radio series
1950 comics debuts
Detective comics